James Charles Wasdell (May 15, 1914 – August 6, 1983) was an American professional baseball outfielder and first baseman.

Wasdell helped the Dodgers win the 1941 National League pennant. Appearing in 94 games, including 46 as a starting outfielder, Wasdell batted .298 in 287 plate appearances, collecting 79 hits. In the World Series, he appeared in three games, with five at bats; his only hit was a double off Atley Donald of the New York Yankees in the fourth inning of Game 5, the Series' final contest. The Yankees defeated the Dodgers, four games to one.

In 11 MLB seasons, Wasdell played in 888 games and had 2,866 at bats, 339 runs, 782 hits, 109 doubles, 34 triples, 29 home runs, 341 runs batted in, 29 stolen bases, 243 walks, .273 batting average, .332 on-base percentage, .365 slugging percentage, 1,046 total bases and 39 sacrifice hits. Defensively, he recorded a .981 fielding percentage playing primarily at first base and at all three outfield positions.  Including minor league service, Wasdell played for 15 seasons (1935–1950) in Organized Baseball.

He died in New Port Richey, Florida at the age of 69.

References

External links

1914 births
1983 deaths
Baltimore Orioles (IL) players
Baseball players from Cleveland
Birmingham Barons players
Brooklyn Dodgers players
Buffalo Bisons (minor league) players
Chattanooga Lookouts players
Cleveland Indians players
Indianapolis Indians players
Major League Baseball first basemen
Major League Baseball left fielders
Major League Baseball right fielders
Minneapolis Millers (baseball) players
Minor league baseball managers
Nashville Vols players
Philadelphia Phillies players
Pittsburgh Pirates players
Washington Senators (1901–1960) players
Zanesville Greys players
Wellsville Nitros players